Charles Henry Smith (1887 – 13 February 1956) was a British gymnast. He competed in the men's artistic individual all-around event at the 1908 Summer Olympics.

References

External links
 

1887 births
1956 deaths
British male artistic gymnasts
Olympic gymnasts of Great Britain
Gymnasts at the 1908 Summer Olympics
Place of birth missing